Filestan Rural District is in the Central District of Pakdasht County, Tehran province, Iran. At the National Census of 2006, its population was 14,622 in 3,642 households. There were 16,147 inhabitants in 4,307 households at the following census of 2011. At the most recent census of 2016, the population of the rural district was 15,926 in 4,439 households. The largest of its seven villages was Golzar, with 5,897 people.

References 

Pakdasht County

Rural Districts of Tehran Province

Populated places in Tehran Province

Populated places in Pakdasht County